Tethea trifolium is a moth in the family Drepanidae. It is found in China (Heilongjiang, Jilin), the Russian Far East and Japan (Hokkaido, Honshu). The habitat consists of various types of mixed and broad-leaved forests.

The larvae feed on Malus mandshurica and Prunus avium.

References

Moths described in 1895
Thyatirinae